Pernilla Larsson (born 18 September 1976) is a Swedish football referee. She was selected by FIFA for the 2015 FIFA Women's World Cup.

In 2014, she was voted ninth in the International Federation of Football History & Statistics (IFFHS) World's Best Woman Referee poll, behind winner Bibiana Steinhaus. Larsson was named Swedish female Referee of the Year at Fotbollsgalan in 2014. The same year, she served as a referee at the 2014 FIFA U-17 Women's World Cup.

References

External links

 FIFA interview
Profile at footballzz.com

Living people
1976 births
Swedish football referees
Women association football referees
FIFA Women's World Cup referees